Convicted Woman is a 1940 crime film starring Rochelle Hudson and directed by Nick Grinde. It is also known as Dames and Daughters of Today.

Plot

Cast

References

External links

1940 films
1940 crime films
American black-and-white films
American crime films
Columbia Pictures films
1940s English-language films
Women in prison films
Films directed by Nick Grinde
1940s American films